Santa Maria de Besora is a municipality in the comarca of Osona in Catalonia, Spain. It is situated on the north side of the Bellmunt range in the north of the comarca. It is linked to Sant Quirze de Besora and to Vidrà by a local road. Besora castle has an eleventh-century Romanesque church: there is also a pre-roman chapel at Sant Moí. Santa Maria de Besora became part of Osona in the comarcal revision of 1990: previously it formed part of the Ripollès.

Demography

References

 Panareda Clopés, Josep Maria; Rios Calvet, Jaume; Rabella Vives, Josep Maria (1989). Guia de Catalunya, Barcelona: Caixa de Catalunya.  (Spanish).  (Catalan).

External links 
Official website 
 Government data pages 

Municipalities in Osona